Techi Sonam (born 5 June 1997) is an Indian cricketer. He made his List A debut on 21 February 2021, for Arunachal Pradesh in the 2020–21 Vijay Hazare Trophy. He made his Twenty20 debut on 4 November 2021, for Arunachal Pradesh in the 2021–22 Syed Mushtaq Ali Trophy.

References

External links
 

1997 births
Living people
Indian cricketers
Arunachal Pradesh cricketers
Place of birth missing (living people)